Hadenoecus opilionides, the Tennessee cave cricket, is a species of camel cricket in the family Rhaphidophoridae. It is found in North America.

Subspecies
These two subspecies belong to the species Hadenoecus opilionides:
 Hadenoecus opilionides australis Hubbell, 1978
 Hadenoecus opilionides opilionides Hubbell, 1978

References

Rhaphidophoridae
Articles created by Qbugbot
Insects described in 1978